Phir Bhi is a 1971 Bollywood drama film directed by Shivendra Sinha. The film stars Partap Sharma and Urmila Bhatt. Partap Sharma won the 1971 National Award for the lead role in this feature film which also won the National Film Award for Best Feature Film in Hindi.

Cast
Partap Sharma
Urmila Bhatt
Meenal Mehta
Rajeshwar Nath
Bimbi
Deven Shrivastav

Music
"Ham Chaahen Ya Na Chaahen Hamraahi Bana Leti Hain" - Hemant Kumar
"Kyon Pyaala Chhalakta Hai Kyon Deepak Jalta Hai" - Manna Dey
"Saanjh Khile Bhor Jhar Phool Har Singaar Ke" - Hemant Kumar, Ranu Mukherjee

References

External links
 

1971 films
1970s Hindi-language films
1971 drama films